Jeron Robinson (born April 30, 1991 in Angleton, Texas) is an American track and field high jumper.  He is a three time NCAA Div II Outdoor Champion (2013-2015) while jumping for Texas A&M–Kingsville.  His 2015 victory was capped by a personal best , to set the NCAA Division II record.  He also won the 2013 DII Indoor Championships, finishing second and third the following years.  He was the USTFCCCA Div. II Male Athlete of the Year in 2014 and 2015.

After taking 4th at the 2017 USAs outdoors, Robinson took the 2018 USA championship men’s high jump title with a Jump of 2.31m

In 2017, he repeated his 2015 feat finishing 4th at the USA Outdoor Track and Field Championships.

Fourth place is normally considered the worst position because it just misses qualifying for subsequent competitions, however in 2017, due to Erik Kynard already holding a bye as Diamond League Champion, Robinson advanced to the 2017 World Championships.

Competition Record
Jeron Robinson signed to representing Nike, Inc. and continues to do so since his 2017 US Indoor Championships.

Texas A&M-Kingsville Javelinas

Prep

References

External links
 
 
 Jeron Robinson profile IAAF Diamond League
 Video of Jeron Robinson's 2.31 m - 7' 7" high jump in 2015

1991 births
Living people
American male high jumpers
African-American male track and field athletes
World Athletics Championships athletes for the United States
Track and field athletes from Houston
Sportspeople from Austin, Texas
Athletes (track and field) at the 2019 Pan American Games
Pan American Games track and field athletes for the United States
USA Outdoor Track and Field Championships winners
USA Indoor Track and Field Championships winners
21st-century African-American sportspeople